A stationary bicycle (also known as exercise bicycle, exercise bike, spinning bike, spin bike, or exercycle) is a device used as exercise equipment for indoor cycling. It includes a saddle, pedals, and some form of handlebars arranged as on a (stationary) bicycle.

A stationary bicycle is usually       a special-purpose exercise machine resembling a bicycle without wheels. It is also possible to adapt an ordinary bicycle for stationary exercise by placing it on bicycle rollers or a trainer. Rollers and trainers are often used by racing cyclists to warm up before racing, or to train on their own machines indoors.

History
The ancestors of modern stationary bicycles date back to the end of the eighteenth century.  The Gymnasticon was an early example.

Types
Some models feature handlebars that are connected to the pedals so that the upper body can be exercised along with the lower body. Most exercise bikes provide a mechanism for applying resistance to the pedals which increases the intensity of the exercise. Resistance mechanisms include magnets, fans, and friction mechanisms. Some models allow the user to pedal backwards to exercise antagonist muscles which are not exercised in forward pedaling. Exercise bicycles are typically manufactured using a crankshaft and bottom bracket, which turns a flywheel by means of a belt or chain. The bearings on these moving parts wear with use and may require replacement.

Specialized indoor bicycles manufactured using a weighted flywheel at the front are used in the indoor cycling exercises called spinning.

Various types of indoor mini-cycles (also known as exercise pedallers) have also developed as portable, inexpensive alternatives to traditional stationary bicycles. They are useful when exercisers are unable to access their stationary bicycles from their homes or local gyms when travels or at work.

Uses
Exercise bikes are used for exercise, to increase general fitness, for weight loss, and for training for cycle events. The exercise bike has long been used for physical therapy because of the low-impact, safe, and effective cardiovascular exercise it provides.  The low-impact movement involved in operating an exercise bike does not put much stress on joints and does not involve sporadic motions that some other fitness equipment may require. However, as with typical biking, extended use of a stationary bike has been linked to decreased sexual function.

Stationary bikes are also used for physical testing, i.e. as ergometers for measuring power. Traditionally this is done by imposing a certain level of resistance mechanically and/or measuring this. gives a good overview. Modern ergometers and even many consumer exercise bikes are fitted with electronic sensors and displays.

Ergometers, such as CEVIS (Cycle Ergometer with Vibration Isolation and Stabilization System), are used in space (e.g. in the ISS) to counter cardiovascular deconditioning in the microgravity environment.

Mini-cycles offer exercisers low intensity physical activities that helps "burn calories, helps moderate blood sugar levels, help combat cholesterol, provides gentle toning, keeps joints mobile through gentle use and improves general circulation." They are also often used by people for rehabilitation purposes after suffering physical injuries.

See also
 Bicycle trainer
 Elliptical trainer
 Outline of cycling
 Peloton
 Zwift

References

Cycle types
Exercise equipment